Dmitri Yuryevich Voyetskiy (born 13 January 1975) is a Russian football manager and a former player. He is an assistant coach with FC Shinnik Yaroslavl.

Coaching career
Voyetskiy managed FC Chayka Peschanokopskoye for the first twenty matches of the 2019–20 Russian National Football League season.

External links
 

1975 births
People from Syzran
Living people
Russian footballers
Association football midfielders
Russian football managers
FC Sokol Saratov managers
Sportspeople from Samara Oblast